Crewe or Crew is a surname of Old Welsh origin.

People with this surname include
Albert Crewe (1927–2009), physicist and inventor of the scanning transmission electron microscope
Bertie Crewe (1860–1937), British theatre designer
Bob Crewe (1930–2014), American songwriter, singer, manager, and record producer
Francis Albert Eley Crew (1886–1973), British animal geneticist
Sir George Harpur Crewe, 8th Baronet (1795–1844), English Tory politician
Harvey and Jeannette Crewe, murder victims in New Zealand
Henry Harpur Crewe (1828–1883), English clergyman and naturalist 
Hungerford Crewe, 3rd Baron Crewe (1812–1894)
John Crewe (disambiguation), various persons of that name, including:
John Crewe, 1st Baron Crewe (1742–1829)
John Crewe, 2nd Baron Crewe (1772–1835)
Quentin Crewe (1926–1998), English journalist, author and adventurer
Ranulph Crewe (1558–1646), English judge and Chief Justice of the King's Bench
Thomas Crewe (1565–1634), English Member of Parliament and lawyer, Speaker of the House of Commons
Tom Crewe ( 2023), English writer
 Amanda Crew, Canadian film and television actress
 Gary Crew,  Australian writer of young adult fiction
 Nathaniel Crew, 3rd Baron Crew, Bishop of Oxford (1671 to 1674) and Bishop of Durham (1674 to 1721)
 Rudy Crew, former Superintendent of Schools of Miami-Dade County Public Schools in Florida, USA

References

fr:Crewe